Monsoon Films is a Bangladeshi entertainment company established by Ananta Jalil, a Bangladeshi film actor, director and producer. His wife Afiea Nusrat Barsha is managing director of Monsoon Films.

Films produced by Monsoon Films

References

External links
 Official Site
 Monsoon Films on Facebook
 Monsoon Films on YouTube

Entertainment companies established in 2010
Film production companies of Bangladesh